The Javone Prince Show is a 2015 variety/comedy sketch show, produced by BBC. The show stars British actor Javone Prince, best known for his role as Jerwayne in PhoneShop. In 2016, Prince was nominated for the British Academy Television Award for Best Male Comedy Performance for his work on the show.

External links 
 

2015 British television series debuts
2015 British television series endings
2010s British comedy television series
BBC television comedy
English-language television shows